The Progressive Conservative Party of Canada fielded a full slate of candidates in the 1979 federal election, and won 136 out of 282 seats to form a minority government.  Many of the party's candidates have their own biography pages; information about others may be found here.

Ontario

Nickel Belt: Harwood Nesbitt

Harwood Nesbitt was a shop technical teacher.  He received 7,308 votes (17.83%), finishing third against New Democratic Party incumbent John Rodriguez.

References

 1979